Vincent Austin Sheheen (born April 29, 1971) is an American attorney and politician. He was a member of the South Carolina Senate from 2004 to 2020, representing the 27th District, which comprises Chesterfield, Kershaw, and Lancaster counties. He is a member of the Democratic Party. He was a member of the South Carolina House of Representatives from 2001 to 2004. He ran for Governor of South Carolina twice, in 2010 and 2014, losing both times to Nikki Haley. In 2020, Sheheen lost reelection to Republican Penry Gustafson, who won by two percentage points.

Sheheen, who is of Lebanese descent, is currently on the board of trustees for In Defense of Christians (IDC), a nonprofit advocating for the rights of Christians in the Middle East.

Background
Vincent Sheheen was born and raised in Camden, South Carolina. His father, Fred Sheheen, was the former executive director of the South Carolina Commission on Higher Education. His mother is Italian.  His uncle Robert Sheheen was the former Speaker of the South Carolina House of Representatives, becoming the first Lebanese speaker of the house in 1986. His great-grandfather Abraham Sheheen immigrated to the U.S. from Lebanon, and his great-grandmother was also Lebanese.

Sheheen received a bachelor's degree from Clemson University, where he met his wife, Amy. Later he attended law school at the University of South Carolina. They have three sons, Anthony and twins Austin and Joseph. Sheheen served as a city prosecutor before being elected to public office and was named, "Legislator of the Year" by the South Carolina Solicitor's Association for his work on behalf of law enforcement.

South Carolina legislature
While serving in the South Carolina House of Representatives, Sheheen worked to create a conservation land bank that has preserved thousands of acres in South Carolina. After Republican Governor Mark Sanford announced that he would reject stimulus money for South Carolina, Sheheen helped lead an effort in the South Carolina Senate to bypass the governor and claim about $700 million in stimulus funds. He is pushing a bi-partisan ethics reform package which would require former legislators to wait eight years before they can register as lobbyists.

Sheheen is the author of the book The Right Way: Getting the Palmetto State Back on Track.

University instructor 
Adjunct instructor (2017–current)

University of South Carolina Honors College

Adjunct instructor (1998–2002)

University of South Carolina School of Law

Guest lecturer (2004–2016)

Francis Marion University Non-Profit Institute

Candidacies for Governor of South Carolina

2010
Sheheen announced his intention to run for governor of South Carolina with the Democratic party on February 6, 2009. On June 8, 2010, Sheheen won the primary over State Superintendent Jim Rex, and was the party's nominee for governor in the November general election. He lost in the general election to the Republican party's nominee, State Representative Nikki Haley, by a margin 51% to 47%.

2014
Sheheen announced his intention for a second run for governor in 2014.

He ran lost to Haley again in 2014, as she won 55 percent of the vote to his 41 percent.

Introduced legislation passed into law 

Listed are some notable pieces of legislation sponsered by States Senator Sheheen, full information and bill lookup can be found on his legislative portal.

H4453 – Revising Life Expectancy Tables

H4575 – Requiring Notice of Rule to Show Cause to be served in Family Court cases

H4132 – Creating Lake Wateree Marine Commission

H3528 – Creating fetal death certificates upon request of parent

S596 – Allowing generation of electronic traffic tickets in South Carolina

S680 – Allowing automatic dispensing of fuel at gas stations in South Carolina

S800 – Increasing fines for failure to restrain children in motor vehicles

S1163 – Restricting successor asbestos-related liability for innocent purchasers

S1346 – Requiring notice to the public before construction of sludge storage facilities

S96 – Banning the sale of aerosol machines to liquefy and inhale alcoholic beverages

S99 – Requiring the State Election Commission to conduct Presidential Primaries in S.C.

S549 – Creating the Jessica Horton Act to require SLED to investigate campus deaths

S577 – Increasing fines for assault and battery against sports officials

S126 – Reforming laws regulating handicap parking and stopping abuse

S134 – Protecting students in exercise of religious freedom at public schools

S629 – Adjusting dates for teacher contracts

S459 – Banning texting while driving in South Carolina

S426 – Creating mental health courts in South Carolina

S980 – Reforming veterinary regulations and small animal laws

S1233 – Adjusting counties' abilities to issue capital improvements sales and use taxes

S173 – Requiring mental health crisis training for law enforcement officers

S302 – Allowing marching band credits to meet required physical education mandates

S567 – Allowing high speed go cart racing in South Carolina

S796 – Creating the Sestercentennial Commission to celebrate the 250th anniversary of the USA

Awards 

Outstanding Public Official, Friends of S.C. Libraries, 2018

Live United Award; United Way of S.C., 2018

Legislative Champion; S.C. Alliance to Fix our Roads, 2017

Legislator of Year; National Alliance on Mental Health Illness, 2017

Legislator of Year; S.C. African American History Comm., 2017

Humane Legislator Award; S.C. Humane Society, 2017

Children's Champion Award; Save the Children, 2017

Citizen of the Year; Omega Fraternity, 2015

Honorary Future Farmers of America Degree; FFA Assoc., 2015

Man of the Year; Allen Univ. Alumni Assoc., 2014

Career Tech. Award; S.C. Assoc. of School Administration Officials, 2013

Friend of Gifted Education Award; S.C. Consortium for Gifted Education, 2013

Policy Maker of the Year; S.C. Career and Tech. Ed. Assoc., 2013

Legislator of Year; S.C. Rural Water Assoc., 2012

Teen Pregnancy Prevention Award; Campaign to Prevent Teen Pregnancy 2009, 2012

Community Health Center Champion Award; S.C. Primary Health Care Assoc., 2012

12 State Legislators to Watch; Governing Magazine, 2012

Green Tie Award; Conservation Voters of S.C., 2011

Appreciation Award; National Wild Turkey Fed. S.C., 2011

Recipient, Political Courage Award; Kershaw County NAACP, 2011

S.C. Tobacco Use Prevention Award; S.C. Collaboration for Reducing Tobacco, 2010

Martin Luther King, Jr. Award; Kershaw County American Cancer Society, 2010

Legislator of Year; S.C. Farm Bureau, 2009

Legislator of the Year; S.C. Recreation and Parks Assoc., 2008

Sportsman of the Year; Assoc. S.C. Field Trial Clubs, 2007

Legislator of the Year; S.C. Solicitors Assoc., 2007

Conservation Champion Award; Conservation Votes of S.C., 2006

Hammer and Trowel Award; Homebuilders of S.C., 2004

U.S. District Court Resolution of Distinguished Service; U.S. District Court, 1998

Outstanding Pro Bono Service Award; U.S.C. School of Law, 1994

Thomas Arkle Clark Award; Alpha Tau Omega Fraternity, 1992

Political positions 

Sheheen has an important figure in developing and enacting transformative change in South Carolina, both before and after serving in elected office.

Retiring the Confederate flag 
In 2014, Sheheen spent months touring the state and speaking to thousands of citizens. Because of the growing divide he saw and experienced, Sheheen made retiring of the Flag from the State House grounds a centerpiece of his campaign for governor. Not long thereafter, Sheheen's seatmate in the Senate, Pastor Clementa Pinckney, was murdered in the Charleston massacre by a Confederate flag-wielding white supremacist. Although mourning the death of his friend, Sheheen quickly renewed his call for removal of the flag pushing other leaders in the state to do the same. Sheheen was responsible for drafting and introducing the legislation that removed the flag and spent weeks planning, cajoling, and creating the legislative plan that gained the necessary votes to remove the flag. The Confederate flag was retired from the State House grounds on July 10, 2015.

Government restructuring 
For years, leaders and commentators had complained about South Carolina's antiquated state government structure. The chief complaint was the lodging of power in the legislatively controlled Budget and Control Board. The reality, however, was that state government operations were too often not adequately controlled by either the legislative or executive branches. Executive functions such as building and fleet management and I.T. were controlled by committee, and legislative oversight of state agencies did not exist. Change had been stymied by turf battles between governors and legislative leaders. Sheheen saw that improving government did not have to be a zero-sum game, so he introduced the Government Restructuring Act of 2014. The Act created a Department of Administration run by the Governor's appointee to handle truly administrative tasks. It abolished the Budget and Control Board and created a system of legislative oversight, ensuring that state agency operations will be reviewed by legislative committees to guard against mission creep, incompetence, and scandal. Sheheen worked tirelessly to bring Republican and Democratic leaders together to pass his Restructuring Act, and it became law in February 2014.

Bringing accountability to operations 
For years, leaders in South Carolina faced accusations of "waste, fraud, and abuse" in state government. But little was done on an organizational level to confront these problems. Sheheen introduced legislation to create a South Carolina Inspector General's Office. Working with Republican and Democratic co-sponsors and allies, the bill became law in 2012, and the Office of Inspector General has investigated and brought to light scores of problems in state government during the last seven years.

Pension reform and funding 
In 2016, South Carolina's public pensions were in crisis. The pension's unfunded liability had reached an unsustainable level exceeding $22 billion dollars and the outlook was bleak. The leadership of the Senate asked Senator Sheheen to co-chair a joint Senate and House committee to study the state's pensions and develop solutions to the pending insolvency. Working with Representative Herbkershman, Sheheen developed a pension reform plan that changed the state's investment strategy, reformed the pensions' governance and operations, and responsibly invested millions of state dollars into drawing down the unfunded liability. These decisions were tough, but necessary. As a result, South Carolina's public pensions are on much firmer footing, paying down outstanding debt, reducing the long term amortization period, and investing more wisely for the future.

Expanding four-year-old kindergarten 
South Carolina's state-funded, full-day kindergarten was created in 2006 as a result of the Abbeville lawsuit, covering only 3,241 students in poverty at a cost of $23 million dollars. Despite national research on the importance of early education, the program remained static for six years without educating any more than this small number of children. In 2013, Sheheen led an effort to expand four-year-old kindergarten (4K) to all at-risk children in the state. The effort successfully increased 4K coverage to 2,380 additional children in 17 new districts. In 2014, Sheheen built a coalition with the Majority Leader, Senator Peeler, to expand 4K and codify it into permanent law. That effort led to expansion covering 64 of the 82 school districts in the state with an additional 2,040 children served. From his role as chairman of the Education/Finance subcommittee, Sheheen has continued his push to expand 4K opportunities in South Carolina. The state currently serves approximately 12,000 four-year-olds living in poverty in 64 counties due to this investment of $82 million dollars annually.

The Higher Education Opportunity Act 
For a generation, Higher Education in South Carolina has been de-prioritized by governors and legislative leaders. Beginning in 2017, Senator Sheheen brought together college presidents, students, legislative leaders, financial officers, and other state leaders to craft the Higher Education Opportunity Act. The Act was the focus of special hearings in the Senate in 2018 with a goal of passage in 2019. The Act would provide a much needed reinvestment in Higher Education in South Carolina, while making college more affordable and focusing on educating in-state students.

Funding roads and improving operations 
South Carolina had not seen a major infusion of funding for roads since 1987, and the potholes and crumbling asphalt proved it. Many in South Carolina said this state of affairs would not change, but in 2017, President Pro Tem of the Senate, Hugh Leatherman, tasked Sheheen with leading a committee to push through a road funding bill. Sheheen spent countless hours building support for a multipronged effort that reformed the governance and operations of road administration, increased the gas tax, and made the overall tax code fairer in South Carolina. The bill was backed by Republicans and Democrats. Working closely with House Speaker Jay Lucas, Sheheen pushed through the bill with enough votes to override a veto from the governor. South Carolina's roads will see an infusion of more than half a billion dollars per year in an effort to responsibly make them better.

Electoral History

State Senate

2010 South Carolina Gubernatorial election

2014 South Carolina Gubernatorial election

References

External links
 
 Senator Vincent A. Sheheen at the South Carolina General Assembly
 

1971 births
20th-century American lawyers
21st-century American politicians
American prosecutors
City and town attorneys in the United States
Clemson University alumni
Living people
Democratic Party members of the South Carolina House of Representatives
People from Camden, South Carolina
Democratic Party South Carolina state senators
University of South Carolina School of Law alumni